Sierra Leone Rising (formerly the Kposowa Foundation) is a non-profit organization based out of Long Beach, California, United States. It was co-founded by Sarah Culberson and John Woehrle.  The Kposowa Foundation's purpose is to raise funds to rebuild a boarding school, provide clean drinking water, provide economically sustainable opportunities, and improve the general quality of life for the people of Sierra Leone, West Africa.

History
Bumpe High School (BHS) was ransacked and burned by R.U.F. rebels during the decade-long civil war in Sierra Leone that lasted from 1991 to 2002. Most of the buildings and furnishings were destroyed or stolen. BHS was once a renowned boarding school with an enrollment of over 600 students from as far away as Nigeria.

Projects
The first goal of the Kposowa Foundation was to rebuild Bumpe High School. The second goal was to sustain the children who were educated there.

Completed projects
12 classrooms were rebuilt to help the school start functioning again.

Due to significant support from The Rotary Foundation, $50,000 was used to construct new wells so that residents of the high school had access to safe, drinkable water.

The Kposowa Foundation helped to rebuild the home economics building at Bumpe High School which was burned down by the rebels during the civil war.

Boys and girls dormitories were built so that children who lived ten miles away did not have to walk to school every day. This improvement also helped to ensure that the children attended school on a regular basis.

The Bumpe High School library was rebuilt allowing students to have access to books which is rare in Sierra Leone.

Ongoing projects
Because public school is not free in Sierra Leone, the Kposowa Foundation is looking to create a scholarship fund for those who cannot afford an education. The Kposowa Foundation is gathering supplies for the Home Economics Building such as sewing machines, pots, pans, utensils, gas cookers, freezers, etc.

The Dining Hall is being rebuilt. When the project is finished it will serve as not only a cafeteria but a central meeting place to share artwork, poetry, and to have discussions.

Media coverage

TV appearances
 Good Morning America 9/19/06, with Robyn Roberts
 Inside Edition / Cheryl Lamothe,  minute, 9/19/06 with Kim
 CNN The American Morning with Solidad O'Brien, 9/20/06
 Southern California Life / KVMD TV Los Angeles, Feb, 28, 2007
 Naomi Judd Morning show, March 13, 2007
 WBOY Channel 12 in Morgantown West Virginia, Nov. 2006
 Intel Campaign filmed 2008 on line "What inspires you", filmed by UNCLE - Rachel North Co-producer UNCLE

Magazines and newspapers
 Positive People Magazine in London
 Trace Magazine based in London
 Newsweek
 People, Maureen Parrington
 Reader's Digest / Ken Miller Nov. 2007 "ken_miller@readersdigest.com
 Corridor Magazine West Virginia
 West Virginia Alumni Magazine
 Los Angeles Times article (Front Page Sept. 2006)
 Chicago Tribune 2006
 Singapore News 2006

Radio
 BBC/Owen Phillips Sept. 2006
 Atlanta Radio "African Exp. Radio 2006
 Oprah and Friends Radio show with Gayle King 2006
 NPR (National Public Radio) with Farai Chideya May 1, 2007 (listen on the website) "Farai Chideya",
 WCLG in Morgantown West Virginia with Becky Hun Nov. 2006
 WAJR in Morgantown West Virginia with Becky Hun with Kay Murray Nov. 2006
 Sarah and the Kposowa Foundation have been featured in various magazines including People

Supporting foundations
-Cowboy

-Groove Wallets

-The LemonAid Fund

-Rotary International

References

External links
The Kposowa Foundation Blog
The Kposowa Foundation Twitter Account
 The Kposowa Foundation Flickr Account

Non-profit organizations based in California
501(c)(3) organizations
Charities based in California
Organizations established in 2005
2005 establishments in California